HD 157753 is giant star in the southern constellation of Ara. It may be an astrometric binary, and it has a faint, magnitude 13 companion at an angular separation of 31.5″ along a position angle of 356° (as of 2000).

References

External links
 HR 6483
 CCDM J17280-5218
 Image HD 157753

Ara (constellation)
157753
Double stars
K-type giants
6483
085470
Durchmusterung objects
Astrometric binaries